Acrolophus praetusalis is a moth of the family Acrolophidae. It is found in South America and Honduras.

References

praetusalis
Moths described in 1858